The Bay School of San Francisco is a private coeducational college preparatory school in San Francisco, California. The school opened in 2004.

History
In 1992, Malcolm Manson, a former headmaster of Marin Country Day School and the Cathedral School for Boys, conceived of the idea of a new high school. In 1996, the school became incorporated.

The school opened in 2004; at that time, a single class of freshmen made up the student body. During the first school year, students attended classes in a temporary building, a "long, majestic white building on Schofield Road facing the bay". In August 2005, the school moved to 35 Keyes Avenue.

Enrollment

The school’s enrollment is 435 students as of September 2021. The Bay School uses an inclusive tuition model, in which there are no additional fees after tuition (except bus transportation).

Curriculum and features

In 2018, The Bay School implemented an experiential learning program, with a schedule of two-semester terms and two “Immersive” terms per academic year. During Immersive terms, students take one class for three weeks.

Bay is a member of the Mastery Transcript Consortium, an organization of schools that grade students based on competency rather than giving letter grades.

Interdisciplinary and specialized courses include a study of water and politics in the American West, the history and art of hip-hop, and the mathematics of digital animation.

Athletics 
The Bay School fields teams in 11 sports: cross-country, track and field, basketball, baseball, golf, lacrosse, sailing, soccer, softball, tennis, and volleyball.

References

External links
 
 Rehabilitation projects: Bay School of San Francisco
 National Park Services - The Mediterranean Revival

High schools in San Francisco
Preparatory schools in California
Educational institutions established in 2004
Private high schools in California
2004 establishments in California
Presidio of San Francisco